"Kids in Love" is a song by Norwegian DJ and record producer Kygo, featuring American rock band the Night Game and uncredited vocals from Maja Francis. It was composed and produced by Kygo, with additional composition from Pete Townshend, Martin Johnson, Linda Karlsson and Sonny Gustafsson, and lyrics written by the latter three as well as Kyle Puccia. The song was released via Sony Music and Ultra Music on 20 October 2017, as the lead single from Kygo's second studio album of the same name.

Background
The song was first played at Ultra Music Festival in Miami in March 2017. Starting from 11 October 2017, Kygo's team invited eleven celebrities, including Vin Diesel, The Chainsmokers, Ryan Tedder, Josephine Skriver, Ansel Elgort, Rickie Fowler, Rob Gronkowski, Logan Paul, Adrian Grenier, Jay Alvarrez and Juan Mata, to tell the story of their first love on social media, as a promotion of the single and album.

Critical reception
Kat Bein of Billboard praised the pop rock song, describing it as "big, bold and bright as the sun". Matthew Meadow of Your EDM opined that "the song is just as good as we remember it pumping out over the Miami crowd".

Track listing

Credits and personnel
Credits adapted from Tidal.
 Kygo – composition, production
 Martin Johnson – composition, lyrics, vocals
 Linda Karlsson – composition, lyrics
 Pete Townshend – composition
 Sonny Gustafsson – composition, lyrics
 Kyle Puccia – lyrics
 Serban Ghenea – mixing engineering
 John Hanes – mixing engineering
 Sören von Malmborg – mastering engineering
 Maja Francis – vocals
 David Rodriguez – recording engineering

Charts

Certifications

Release history

References

2017 songs
2017 singles
Kygo songs
The Night Game songs
Pop rock songs
Song recordings produced by Kygo
Songs written by Kygo
Songs written by Martin Johnson (musician)
Songs written by Pete Townshend
Sony Music singles
Ultra Music singles